John Edwin Byers (1897–1931) was a professional footballer who played for Selby Town, Huddersfield Town, Blackburn Rovers, West Bromwich Albion, Worcester City, Torquay United and Kidderminster Harriers.

References

1897 births
1931 deaths
English footballers
Association football forwards
People from Selby
English Football League players
Knaresborough Town A.F.C. players
Selby Town F.C. players
Huddersfield Town A.F.C. players
Blackburn Rovers F.C. players
West Bromwich Albion F.C. players
Worcester City F.C. players
Torquay United F.C. players
Kidderminster Harriers F.C. players
Sportspeople from Yorkshire